St. Peter's Church is a religious building of the Catholic Church which is located in Eyrarlandsvegi 26, in the town of Akureyri, Norduland Eystra (Northeast Region) in Iceland, and named after Saint Peter.

St. Peter's Church follows the Roman or Latin rite and is located within the Roman Catholic Diocese of Reykjavík, the capital of Iceland. The church is noted for its red and white colors. The house was built in 1912, acquired by the church in 1952 and rebuilt to the St. Peter's Church in 1998 to 2000.

Another church also dedicated to St. Peter is located nearby in Hrafnagilsstræti 2.

See also
Roman Catholicism in Iceland
St. Peter's Church

References

Roman Catholic churches in Iceland
Buildings and structures in Akureyri